Oregon Route 454 (OR 454) is an Oregon state highway running from OR 452 near Adrian to Peckham Road on the Idaho state line near Adrian. OR 454 is known as the Adrian-Caldwell Highway No. 454 (see Oregon highways and routes).

OR 454 was established in 2003 as part of Oregon's project to assign route numbers to highways that previously were not assigned, and, as of July 2018, was unsigned.

Route description

OR 454 begins at an intersection with OR 452 approximately one mile southeast of Adrian and heads south, east, south, and east, crossing OR 453 twice, to the Idaho state line.  At the state line, OR 454 turns south along State Line Road to an intersection with Peckham Road from Idaho, where it ends.

History

OR 454 was assigned to the Adrian-Caldwell Highway in 2003.

Major intersections

References

454
Transportation in Malheur County, Oregon